Sarivahy Vombola is a Malagasy international footballer who plays for Yeni Amasyaspor in Turkey.

He was the top scorer in the 2015 COSAFA Cup with five goals in five games.
Despite that, Vombola has never reselected by Nicolas Dupuis for returning in the national team.

International career

International goals
Scores and results list Madagascar's goal tally first.

Honours

Club
CNaPS Sport
 THB Champions League (4): 2013, 2014, 2015, 2016
 Coupe de Madagascar (3): 2011, 2015, 2016

National Team
 COSAFA Cup third place: 2015
Top scorer COSAFA Cup (1) : 2015

References

External links

1988 births
Living people
Malagasy footballers
Madagascar international footballers
Association football forwards
CNaPS Sport players